Shuswap  may refer to:
 Secwepemc, an indigenous people in British Columbia, Canada, also known in English as the Shuswap
 Shuswap Nation Tribal Council, a multi-band regional organization of Secwepemc governments based in Kamloops, British Columbia
 Northern Shuswap Tribal Council, aka the Cariboo Tribal Council, a multi-band regional organization of Secwepemc governments based in Williams Lake, British Columbia
 Shuswap Indian Band, aka the Shuswap First Nation, a member government of the Shuswap Nation Tribal Council and the Ktunaxa Kinbasket Tribal Council
 Shuswap Indian Reserve, an Indian reserve located in Invermere, British Columbia, under the jurisdiction of the Shuswap Indian Band
 Shuswap, British Columbia, a locality adjacent to and including that Indian reserve
 Shuswap language, a language spoken by the Secwepemc
 Shuswap River, a river in the Monashee Mountains and North Okanagan of British Columbia
 Shuswap Country, a region in the interior of British Columbia, often called simply "the Shuswap"
 Shuswap Lake, a lake that is the core of the same region
 Shuswap Lake Provincial Park, a provincial park in British Columbia
 Shuswap (provincial electoral district), an electoral district, represented in the Legislative Assembly of British Columbia
 Shuswap-Revelstoke, a defunct electoral district in British Columbia, 1966–1986
 Columbia-Shuswap Regional District, a regional district government in British Columbia